Hispanic Information and Telecommunications Network, Inc. (HITN) is the largest Spanish-language public broadcasting network in the United States. It delivers educational programming to over 44 million homes nationwide, and reaches over 40% of US households.
 
Its distribution network includes Xfinity, DirecTV, DirectTV NOW, Verizon FiOS, Dish Network, Cablevision, AT&T U-verse TV, Charter Communications, Charter Spectrum, Mediacom, CenturyLink Prism, Altice, and a host of smaller distributors.

The HITN mission is to offer US Hispanic audiences relevant, varied and high-quality content that both educates and entertains.

In 2017, the HITN network was nominated for three Emmy Awards in the arts, community, and public service categories.

HITN TV
HITN TV, established in 1981, is a branch of HITN and provides non-commercial Spanish-language educational programming in the United States. 
HITN-TV is a leading Spanish-language media company that offers educational and cultural programming for the whole family.  It reaches more than 44 million viewers in the US and Puerto Rico via DIRECTV, DISH Network, AT&T U-verse TV, Verizon FiOS TV, Comcast, Charter Spectrum, Frontier Mediacom, CenturyLink Prism and Cablevision.

Its most recent original productions include Estudio DC con Gerson Borrero (interviews with leading Latino figures in government, media, music, arts & entertainment, and sports).;Voces (Success stories of Hispanics who have transformed their community in the United States); Puerto Rico Contigo (about the solidarity work and the common effort of the people of the island in the face of adversity); En Foco con Neida Sandoval (interviews and research reports), Mundo CNET (information and the latest news from the technology industry) and Mundo Salvaje con Ron Magill (to discover and learn about the wild animals of the planet).

It also presents Centro Medico, a docudrama with recreations of medical cases in a hospital environment, accompanied by simple explanations and easy to understand medical issues relevant to the audience. The first season reached a visualization increase of more than 154%, according to Nielsen's measurements, positioning the show among the five largest audiences of the channel. Last September, HITN presented a 32-hour marathon of the first season. During the television marathon clues were offered for the audience to participate and win a trip for two to Madrid to meet the protagonists and the production team of the successful program.

The network also developed Corriente Cultural and En Foco, which highlighted the cultural and artistic achievements of Latinos in the US. Also, through Dialogo and Destination Casa Blanca, HITN has covered every US presidential election cycle since 2004. While providing this coverage, HITN also focused on the impact of each election, on Latinos living in the US.

In 2017, HITN TV was nominated for three Emmy Awards in the arts, community, and public service categories. In the arts category, HITN TV was nominated for the production Arte Desde 3 Perspectivas en un Mismo Idioma. In the community/public service categories, the network was singled out for the PSAs Lo Que Realmente Importa and Nuestro Voto, Nuestra Voz.

In 2018, HITN partnered with the office of the Brooklyn District Attorney, to create and launch a new anti-cyber bullying program.

The network has developed the HITN app, that enable subscribers to access its authenticated TV Everywhere and VOD services whenever and wherever they choose on devices with an Internet connection. The HITN app can be downloaded from Apple's App Store and Google Play. The new app makes HITN the first Hispanic Pay TV network to give its subscribers the opportunity to enjoy their favorite content on both their mobile devices and Apple TV.

Edye
In 2019, HITN launched the children's streaming service Edye.

Viewership and growth
As of 2012, HITN delivered programming to over 40% of US households, through both satellite and cable TV channels.

As of 2017, HITN TV reached over 44 million homes in the US and Puerto Rico.

During the tenure of HITN President and CEO Mike Nieves, 10 million more homes were added in two years (2016–17).

HITN expanded its headquarters by moving to the Brooklyn Navy Yard. The new facility has 46,000 square feet, and a 3,000 square foot enclosed studio on the building's roof.

Educational broadband spectrum

As the largest holder of Educational Broadband Spectrum (EBS) in the US and Puerto Rico  HITN focuses on
creating wireless broadband educational networks, and developing media platforms for their educational programming.

Most of the EBS Spectrum held by HITN is leased to companies such as Clearwire/Sprint Nextel. In 2012, HITN partnered with Connect to Compete (C2C) to promote broadband adoption, distance learning, and digital literacy in disadvantaged communities.

Tu Momento 

In 2016, a record-breaking 27.3 million Hispanics were eligible to vote, but it was estimated that only 48% of eligible Hispanics would vote. HITN felt a responsibility to empower the Latino electorate and encourage voter participation through education.
For this reason, HITN launched Tu Momento 2016. Hosted by Gerson Borrero and scheduled to run from April through Election Day, Tu Momento 2016 encouraged voter participation by educating the Spanish speaking community on the complex U.S. electoral system.
The Vive Tu Momento contest was the final component of Tu Momento 2016 campaign. The contest was not a game of luck, but rather a test of knowledge since participants were challenged to utilize their grasp of the presidential election and their understanding of the Electoral College to predict which states each presidential candidate would win on Election Day. HITN-TV carefully examined hundreds of entries and in the end found one contestant to be the most politically astute: Mrs. Leticia Ibarra became the contest winner after being the first to accurately predict the voting results for 46 states.
After the elections, Tu Momento evolved to become Estudio DC.

Vida y Salud
The network has developed a programming strategy based on thematic blocks dedicated to topics such as health, science and technology, natural history and children's content. 'Vida y Salud TV' is a daily block designed to promote good health and well-being among US Hispanic audiences, hosted by Dr. Aliza, creator of the popular website VidaySalud.com. The award-winning TV show, Ask Dr. Nandi, which reaches over ninety million US households, will be also included in HITN's ‘Vida y Salud TV’ program block.‘Ask Doctor Nandi’ will broadcast with Spanish subtitles weekdays at 3:00 p.m. Eastern / 11:00 a.m. Pacific starting Monday, November 6
This programming block is a unique space with the potential to have a positive impact in Hispanic audiences, giving them access to information to improve their health and well-being.

HITN Learning

As a recipient of a $30 million grant from the federal Ready to Learn Program (2010-2016), HITN designed and distributed transmedia learning resources to promote school readiness.

The network originated and delivers several national educational programs through HITN Learning: an online, bilingual (English/Spanish) educational program that delivers innovative content aligned to the Common Core State Standards in English/Language Arts and Mathematics for grades 3-6.

In 2017, the HITN network was honored as a finalist for the 2017 Kids Imagination Awards, an annual awards program celebrating the best in children's, teen and family programming., helps preschoolers to develop early English-language skills, for a successful start in Kindergarten. 
 
In 2018, HITN Learning launched 'Cleo & Cuquin Family Fun! math kits', a unique bilingual mix of print and digital hands-on activities and games built around educational goals. The multimedia learning experience helps parents to enhance their child's Kindergarten readiness.
The kits focus on key Math skills that provide a strong foundation for Kindergarten learning and success, and are based on resources developed and evaluated under a Ready To Learn grant from the U.S. Department of Education.
The Family Fun Kits and Apps offer bilingual print and digital activities for English language learners.

Project LAMP

HITN was a participant in Project LAMP (Learning Apps Media Partnership), a children's educational trans-media initiative.

LAMP is a component of the U.S. Department of Education's "Ready To Learn" program, which is designed to help close the achievement gap of low-income young people, by creating multi-platform digital media-based programs for children aged three to eight.

Industry recognition and awards

In 2017, the HITN network was nominated for three Emmy Awards in the arts, community, and public service categories. The network was nominated in the Arts category for the production: ‘Arte Desde 3 Perspectivas en un Mismo Idioma.’  In the community/public service category, the network was singled out for the PSAs ‘Lo Que Realmente Importa’ and ‘Nuestro Voto, Nuestra Voz’. 
The same year, the network was the winner of the Cynopsis Media’s Social Good Leader award for its innovative Tu Momento 2016 campaign, an educational and informational campaign designed and produced by HITN to help Hispanics across the country better understand the U.S. presidential election process. The campaign, launched April 2016, released a new educational video every few months that coincided with the ongoing events of the presidential election that took place last year. Tu Momento addressed questions like: What is a political convention? Who are super delegates? How does the Electoral College work? By using a combination of short vignettes designed with info-graphics, along with carefully crafted explanations, HITN took complicated subject matter and successfully communicated to its viewers the importance of better understanding the details of the presidential electoral process.

Also in 2017, HITN was awarded the Kidscreen Award for Best Preschool Learning App-Tablet.

In 2017 again, the HITN network was honored as a finalist for the 2017 Kids Imagination Awards, an annual awards program celebrating the best in children’s, teen and family programming.

Helping Puerto Rico

When Hurricane Maria struck in 2017, Puerto Rico was left in complete darkness due to sweeping power outages that lasted months before authorities restored electricity on the island. Months later, during the early weeks of April, a blackout swept the island after a single tree fell on a power line in the southeastern town of Cayey and knocked out power for 840,000 people across Puerto Rico. And a week later, an excavator hit a transmission line, which again severed power – this time for 1.4 million people. 
HITN coordinated the distribution of 18,000 solar panel lamps to families in fourteen municipalities still struggling with power outages. The municipalities in attendance were: Barranquitas, Bayamón, Comerío, Dorado, Las Marías, Loíza, Morovis, San Lorenzo, San Sebastián, Ponce, Utuado, Villalba, Vega Alta, Vega Baja. 
The lamps, were provided by Hispanic Federation, the nation's premier Latino nonprofit membership organization, with a focus to support Hispanic families and strengthen non-profits through work in the areas of education, health, immigration, civic engagement and economic empowerment.
Also, when obtaining water was one of the country's top priorities, HITN  contributed to Centro for Puerto Rico to purchase 52,440 gallon water tanks for victims of the hurricane, through the Agua Pa’l Pueblo Movement.

External links

See also

PBS
Preschoolers
Kindergarten
Distance learning
Appsqueremos de pongan de Nuevo Arabia salvage por favorGracias

Notes

Public television in the United States
.
Spanish-language television networks in the United States
United States
1983 establishments in the United States
Television channels and stations established in 1983
Organizations based in Brooklyn